is a Japanese actor, tarento and idol. He is a member of Johnny's West, which is under the management of Johnny & Associates.

Biography
In February 2004, Kamiyama joined Johnny & Associates as a Kansai Lesson-sei and worked Johnny's Jr. units Kansai Boy's and Top Kids.

He participated in his first marathon at the 5th Osaka Marathon on 25 October 2015. Although his knees were hurt, Kamiyama finished six hours, 37 minutes and fifteen seconds, but he could not achieve the goal of cutting four hours.

Filmography

TV dramas

Films

Stage

References

1993 births
Living people
Japanese idols
Japanese television personalities
Japanese male film actors
Japanese male child actors
Japanese male stage actors
Japanese male television actors
Actors from Hyōgo Prefecture
Musicians from Hyōgo Prefecture
21st-century Japanese male actors
21st-century Japanese singers
21st-century Japanese male singers